Colombe Jacobsen-Derstine (born December 21, 1977) is an American chef and actress. She attended the Natural Gourmet School in New York City, and competed in the 2007 season of The Next Food Network Star. She currently hosts Colombe du jour, her own food-related website and blog.

As an actress, she is best known for her child roles, including Julie "The Cat" Gaffney in the film series The Mighty Ducks.

Biography
Born in Chicago, Jacobsen-Destine began her career as a child actor, making her film debut in 1993. The following year, she was cast as a hockey player in D2: The Mighty Ducks.  In 1996, she played the same role in D3: The Mighty Ducks. Following an extended acting break, she attended the Natural Gourmet School in New York, where she graduated in 2004. During her culinary training, she worked as an actress in the films Men in Black II, Moonlight Mile, and Searching for Haizmann. Prior to the Natural Gourmet School, Jacobsen attended Sarah Lawrence College, where she graduated in 2000.

Filmography

References

External links
 
 Colombe Jacobsen interview at The Kitchn
 

1977 births
Living people
Actresses from Chicago
Chefs from Chicago
American child actresses
American film actresses
Sarah Lawrence College alumni
American women chefs
21st-century American women